Mimi Khalvati (born 28 April 1944) is an Iranian-born British poet.

Life and career
She was born in Tehran, Iran on 28 April 1944. She grew up on the Isle of Wight and was educated in Switzerland at the University of Neuchâtel, and in London at the Drama Centre and the School of Oriental and African Studies.

She then worked as a theatre director in Tehran, translating from English into Persian and devising new plays, as well as co-founding the Theatre in Exile group.

She now lives in London Borough of Hackney, and is a Visiting Lecturer at Goldsmiths College and a director of the London Poetry School.

Khalvati was 47 when her first book was published in 1991. Its title, In White Ink, derives from the work of Hélène Cixous who claimed that women in the past have written "in white ink". Michael Schmidt observes that Khalvati is "formally a most resourceful poet".

Khalvati is the founder of The Poetry School, running poetry workshops and courses in London, and is co-editor of the school's first two anthologies of new writing: Tying the Song and Entering The Tapestry. She is also tutor at the Arvon Foundation, and has taught creative writing at universities and colleges in the United States of America and Britain.

Works
 In White Ink (Carcanet Press,1991)
 Mirrorwork (Carcanet Press, 1995)
 Entries on Light (Carcanet Press, 1997)
 Selected Poems (Carcanet Press, 2000)
 The Chine (Carcanet Press, 2002)
 The Meanest Flower (Carcanet Press, 2007)
 Child: new and selected poems 1991-2011
The Weather Wheel (Carcanet Press, 2014)
"Afterwardness" (Carcanet Press, 2019)

Quotes
 "There is some poetry in the universe, in the world we live in. What poets do is to first be alive to it, and awake and receptive to it, and in love with it – I think it has a lot to do with love – and then have the wherewithal to translate that poetry that’s out there into poems, so, for me it’s an act of listening and of translating into heard and written language."

References

Further reading
Kociejowski, Marius. God's Zoo: Artists, Exiles, Londoners (Carcanet, 2014) contains a biographical chapter "Tehran in Stoke Newington - Mimi Khalvati, Vuillard and the Stone of Patience".

External links
 Poetry School website
 Profile at Poetry Translation Centre, with links to poems, articles, audio and video footage
 Khalvati's official website
Listen to Mimi Khalvati reading her poetry - a British Library recording, 14 July 2008.
 Profile and poems, written and audio at Poetry Archive
 Second Light profile and poems
 "Interview: Labelled a "Persian poet", Mimi Khalvati owes as much to the Isle of Wight as Iran" Independent 17 August 2007
 “The Weather Wheel”: An interview with Mimi Khalvati - 23 January 2015

1944 births
Living people
Fellows of the Royal Society of Literature
People from Tehran
English women poets
Iranian emigrants to the United Kingdom
University of Neuchâtel alumni
International Writing Program alumni
People from Hackney Central
People from the London Borough of Hackney
British expatriates in Switzerland